The Berlingozzo is a cake from Lamporecchio, in the province of Pistoia, Central Italy. It is a simple ring-shaped cake, flavored with anise, and it has its origins in the time of the Medici. It is a typical Carnival cake, its name appearing to derive from the word Berlingaccio, meaning “Fat Thursday”.

The ingredients are: egg yolks, flour, sugar, grated lemon and / or orange zest, butter and milk.

External links 
Page at turismo.intoscana.it

References 

Italian cakes
Pistoia
Butter cakes
Carnival foods